Ancienne Douane ("Old Custom house") is a 14th-century building on the Grande Île, the historic city centre of Strasbourg, France. The structure is classified as a Monument historique by the French Ministry of Culture since 1948.

The custom house was built in 1358 and enlarged in 1389. It was heavily damaged by British and American bombing raids on 11 August 1944 and left as a ruin for almost two decades before being rebuilt according to the medieval plans by architect Robert Will (1910–1998).

The Ancienne Douane currently houses a restaurant and a covered market.

References

External links

Ancienne Douane on archi-wiki.org
Marie Marty: Quand l’Ancienne douane était le Rungis de Strasbourg, Rue89 Strasbourg, 24 December 2015 

Gothic architecture in Strasbourg
14th-century architecture
Custom houses
Tourist attractions in Strasbourg
Monuments historiques of Strasbourg
Restaurants in Strasbourg
Buildings and structures completed in 1358
Buildings and structures completed in 1389
Commercial buildings completed in 1965